The 1980 Egyptian Open was a men's tennis tournament played on outdoor clay courts that was part of the 1980 Volvo Grand Prix circuit. It was the fifth edition of the tournament and was played in Cairo,  Egypt from 3 March until 9 March 1980. First-seeded Corrado Barazzutti won the singles title.

Finals

Singles
 Corrado Barazzutti defeated  Paolo Bertolucci 6–4, 6–0
 It was Barazzutti's 1st singles title of the year and the 5th and last of his career.

Doubles
 Tom Okker /  Ismail El Shafei defeated  Christophe Freyss /  Bernard Fritz 6–3, 3–6, 6–3

References

External links
 ITF tournament edition details

Cairo Open
Cairo Open
1980 in Egypt